George Thornburgh (January 25, 1847 – March 9, 1923) was an American politician. He was a Democratic member of the Arkansas House of Representatives.

References

1923 deaths
Speakers of the Arkansas House of Representatives
Democratic Party members of the Arkansas House of Representatives
1847 births
People from Havana, Illinois
People from Washington County, Arkansas
19th-century American politicians